Zou Dehai (born 27 February 1993, in Dalian) is a Chinese footballer who plays as a goalkeeper for Beijing Guoan in the Chinese Super League.

Club career
Zou Dehai started his professional football career in 2011 when he was loaned to Wenzhou Provenza's squad for the 2011 China League Two campaign. He was promoted to Hangzhou Greentown first team squad in 2012 by Takeshi Okada. He made his Super League debut on 28 May 2016 against Jiangsu Suning in a 1-1 draw. After the game he would establish himself as the club's first choice goalkeeper, however he was not able to keep the team from relegation at the end of the 2016 Chinese Super League season.

On 31 January 2019, Zou transferred to Chinese Super League side Beijing Sinobo Guoan. He would make his debut on 1 March 2019, in a league game against Wuhan Zall F.C. that ended in a 1-0 victory. After the game he would establish himself as the club's first choice goalkeeper throughout the season as the club came runners up within the 2019 Chinese Super League season.

Career statistics 
Statistics accurate as of match played 31 January 2023.

References

External links
 

1993 births
Living people
Footballers from Liaoning
Zhejiang Professional F.C. players
Beijing Guoan F.C. players
Chinese Super League players
China League One players
Association football goalkeepers
Chinese footballers